Chiasmia sufflata is a moth of the family Geometridae first described by Achille Guenée in 1858. It is found in Sri Lanka.

References

Moths of Asia
Moths described in 1858